Gorgopis salti is a moth of the family Hepialidae. It is found in Tanzania.

References

Moths described in 1952
Hepialidae